Kosieczyn  is a village in the administrative district of Gmina Zbąszynek, within Świebodzin County, Lubusz Voivodeship, in western Poland.

The village has a population of 950.

Sculptor and painter Marcin Rożek (1885–1944) was born in Kosieczyn.

References

Villages in Świebodzin County